An industrial suburb is a community, near a large city, with an industrial economy. These communities may be established as tax havens or as places where zoning promotes industry, or they may be industrial towns that become suburbs by urban sprawl of the nearby big city.

List of industrial suburbs by country

Australia

Queensland
Brendale
Carole Park
Eagle Farm
Kunda Park
Larapinta
Rocklea

South Australia
Dry Creek

Victoria
Braeside
Moolap
Somerton
Tottenham

Western Australia
Kwinana Beach
Welshpool

New South Wales
Chullora

India
Butibori
Sanathnagar
Kondapalli
Panki, Kanpur

Ireland
Baldonnel, Dublin
Raheen, County Limerick

New Zealand

Auckland
Onehunga
Penrose
Rosebank
Wynyard Quarter

Christchurch
Hornby
Sockburn
Woolston

Dunedin
Burnside

Lower Hutt
Gracefield
Seaview

Nelson
Annesbrook

Rolleston
Izone

United Kingdom
Attercliffe, Sheffield
Cowley, Oxford

United States

California
Commerce
Emeryville (historical)
Industry
Irwindale
Santa Fe Springs
Tiburon (historical)
Vernon

Florida
Medley

Illinois
Bedford Park
Bensenville
Cicero
East St. Louis
Elk Grove Village
Hodgkins
Maywood
McCook
North Chicago
Park City
Waukegan
Zion

Indiana
East Chicago
Gary
Whiting

Michigan
Dearborn
Delta Township
Ecorse
Pontiac
River Rouge
Sterling Heights
Trenton
Warren
Wayne

New Jersey
Paterson
Secaucus (historical)
Teterboro

Ohio
Fairborn

Texas
Pasadena

See also 
 Industrial city
 Suburb

References

Urban geography
Settlement geography